HMS Anchorite (P422/S22), was an Amphion-class submarine of the Royal Navy, built by Vickers Armstrong and launched 22 January 1946.

Design
Anchorite had a displacement of  when at the surface and  while submerged. The submarine was powered by two Admiralty ML eight-cylinder diesel engines generating  each. Four electric motors each producing  drove two shafts.

Anchorite was fitted with ten 21 inch (533 mm) torpedo tubes, one QF 4 inch naval gun Mk XXIII, one Oerlikon 20 mm cannon, and a .303 British Vickers machine gun. Its torpedo tubes were fitted to the bow and stern, and it could carry twenty torpedoes. Its complement was sixty-one crew members.

Anchorite was laid down at Vickers-Armstrongs' Barrow-in-Furness shipyard on 19 July 1945, was launched on 22 January 1946 and completed on 18 November 1947.

Service
During build and before launch the names of Anchorite and HMS Amphion were switched. In 1953 she took part in the Fleet Review to celebrate the Coronation of Queen Elizabeth II.

Anchorite ran aground in Rothesay Bay, Firth of Forth, on 12 October 1956. No-one was injured in the incident. The submarine's commanding officer, Lieutenant Commander W. L. Owen, was cleared of any blame for the incident to the resulting court martial. The rock is now known as Anchorite Rock on the nautical charts of the area at depth, 16 m, .

References

Publications

External links
 Pictures of HMS Anchorite on MaritimeQuest

 

Amphion-class submarines
Cold War submarines of the United Kingdom
Ships built in Barrow-in-Furness
1946 ships
Maritime incidents in 1956
Maritime incidents in 1960